Carol Higgins Clark (born July 28, 1956) is an American mystery author and actress. She is the daughter of suspense writer Mary Higgins Clark, with whom she co-authored several Christmas novels, and the former sister-in-law of author Mary Jane Clark.

Writing career
Born in New York City and raised in Washington Township, Bergen County, New Jersey, Clark received her B.A. from Mount Holyoke College. During college, she began re-typing her mother's transcripts. She also made contributions such as renaming locations and characters.  She was the only one of four siblings to become a writer. One thing that affected this decision was helping her mother. While Mary Higgins Clark attempted juggling a full-time job and trying to finish her second book, the younger Higgins Clark grasped this opportunity to familiarize herself with the process of writing a book and telling tales, not knowing this would be her start in becoming a well-known author. Just as her mother did, Clark writes suspense books. One difference in the mother and daughter's writings is that Clark's books contain a slight sense of humor that her mother's do not possess. All of her novels feature Regan Reilly (a famous recurring character), plot points about male escorts, and pantyhose conventions that come from real sources. In her video for NJN Public Television, Clark explains how she used her first job experience to help her with ideas about her book. In her book "Iced", she uses a woman who is working at a dry cleaners. The woman uncovers evidence found in the pockets of a customer.

Acting
Clark chose acting as her profession and began to study acting after graduating from Mount Holyoke College. In 1975, she starred in "Who Killed Amy Lang", which aired on Good Morning America. She also performed in Wendy Wasserstein's play "Uncommon Women". She played the lead in the film A Cry In The Night, based on a novel by her mother.

Personal life

Clark's New York apartment building, The Belaire, was hit by a small plane on October 11, 2006 flown by New York Yankees pitcher Cory Lidle. Her 38th floor condominium was just a floor below the main impact zone; she was not at home during the accident. Clark has appeared on the game show To Tell The Truth.

Bibliography

Regan Reilly series
 
 
 
 
  (co-written with Mary Higgins Clark; crossover with Mary's Willy & Alvirah series)
 
 
 
  (co-written with Mary Higgins Clark; crossover with Mary's Willy & Alvirah series)
 
 
  (co-written with Mary Higgins Clark; crossover with Mary's Willy & Alvirah series)
 
 
  (co-written with Mary Higgins Clark; crossover with Mary's Willy & Alvirah series)
 
 
 
 
  (due date per publisher)

Other novels co-authored with her mother

Collections co-authored with her mother
 
 A Holiday Collection (2010)

Awards
Clark's début novel Decked was nominated for the 1992 Agatha Award and the 1993 Anthony Award for "Best First Novel".

See also

 List of crime writers

References

External links
 Profile, fantasticfiction.co.uk; accessed August 27, 2015.
 

1956 births
20th-century American novelists
Living people
Mount Holyoke College alumni
People from Washington Township, Bergen County, New Jersey
Novelists from New Jersey
Writers from New York City
American mystery writers
21st-century American novelists
American women novelists
Women mystery writers
American crime fiction writers
20th-century American women writers
21st-century American women writers
Novelists from New York (state)